Vellaunodunum was a Gallic oppidum of the Senones tribe two days' march from Agedincum.  On the outbreak of Vercingetorix's revolt in 52 BC, Julius Caesar marched to this oppidum to besiege it, "in order that he might not leave an enemy in his rear, and might the more easily procure supplies of provisions".  In his own words, he :

Caesar then marched on to besiege Genabum and Noviodunum Biturigum.  These three sieges brought Vercingetorix to open battle at Noviodunum, where Caesar won, though this was soon followed by the Roman defeat at Gergovia.

The exact location of Vellaunodunum has never been fixed; suggested sites including Montargis and Château-Landon.

Notes

52 BC
Populated places in pre-Roman Gaul
Archaeological sites in France
Former populated places in France